Helena Antonette "Lenie" Gerrietsen (born 28 March 1930) is a retired Dutch gymnast who competed at the 1948 Summer Olympics in London and the 1952 Summer Olympics in Helsinki. In 1948, Gerrietsen placed fifth in the team all-around competition. In 1952, she competed in all artistic gymnastics events with her best result being 6th place in the team portable apparatus.

References

1930 births
Living people
Dutch female artistic gymnasts
Gymnasts at the 1948 Summer Olympics
Gymnasts at the 1952 Summer Olympics
Olympic gymnasts of the Netherlands
Sportspeople from Utrecht (city)
20th-century Dutch women
21st-century Dutch women